Huanglian Shangqing Wan is a blackish-brown pill used in Traditional Chinese medicine to "remove heat , ease constipation, dispel wind and relieve pain". It is aromatic, and it tastes bitter. It is used where there is "Wind-heat in the upper part of the body, vertigo and head distension, painful and swollen gums, sores in the mouth or tongue, swollen throat, ear-ache, tinnitus, congestive conjunctivitis, constipation, or dark urine".  The binding agent is honey. Each pill weighs about 6 grams.

Chinese classic herbal formula

See also
 Chinese classic herbal formula
 Bu Zhong Yi Qi Wan

References

Traditional Chinese medicine pills